Columbarium veridicum is a species of deepwater sea snail, a marine gastropod mollusc in the family Turbinellidae, the pagoda shells.

Distribution 
This species occurs off of New Zealand.

References

Turbinellidae
Gastropods of New Zealand
Gastropods described in 1963